Miro Varvodić (born 15 May 1989) is a Croatian professional footballer who plays as a goalkeeper.

Career
Born in Split, Varvodić began his career in the youth of hometown club Hajduk Split, making his professional debut in 2006. In 2007, he spent a loan spell at Mosor and the following two seasons in Germany with 1. FC Köln. After the two-year loan finished, 1. FC Köln signed Varvodić on a permanent deal. He made his Bundesliga debut on 15 October 2010.

On 23 June 2012, he signed a two-year deal with club Qarabağ. In February 2014 Varvodić moved to Greuther Fürth.

He moved to Austrian club SV Horn in 2017.

On 10 January 2019, SV Waldhof Mannheim announced the signing of Varvodić.

On 3 November 2020, he signed a two-year contract with Bosnian Premier League club Zrinjski Mostar. Varvodić left Zrinjski in June 2021.

Personal life
Miro's father is Zoran Varvodić.

References

External links
 

1989 births
Living people
Footballers from Split, Croatia
Association football goalkeepers
Croatian footballers
Croatia youth international footballers
HNK Hajduk Split players
NK Mosor players
1. FC Köln players
Qarabağ FK players
SpVgg Greuther Fürth II players
SV Horn players
Stuttgarter Kickers players
SV Waldhof Mannheim players
HŠK Zrinjski Mostar players 
Croatian Football League players
Bundesliga players
Azerbaijan Premier League players
Regionalliga players
2. Liga (Austria) players
3. Liga players
Premier League of Bosnia and Herzegovina players
Croatian expatriate footballers
Expatriate footballers in Austria
Croatian expatriate sportspeople in Austria
Expatriate footballers in Germany
Croatian expatriate sportspeople in Germany
Expatriate footballers in Azerbaijan
Croatian expatriate sportspeople in Azerbaijan
Expatriate footballers in Bosnia and Herzegovina
Croatian expatriate sportspeople in Bosnia and Herzegovina